Following the work of Georg Wilhelm Friedrich Hegel, Karl Marx outlined the workings of a political consciousness.

The politics of consciousness
Consciousness typically refers to the idea of a being who is self-aware.  It is a distinction often reserved for human beings.  This remains the original and most common usage of the term.   For Marx, consciousness describes a person's political sense of self.  That is, consciousness describes a person's awareness of politics.  For Marx, an authentic consciousness was linked to understanding one's true position in History.  While Hegel placed God behind the workings of consciousness in people, Marx saw the political economy as the engine of mind.

In the 20th century, many social movements and intellectuals have developed this use of consciousness.

False consciousness

In Marx's view, consciousness was always political, for it was always the outcome of politic-economic circumstances.  What one thinks of life, power, and self, for Marx, is always a product of ideological forces.

For Marx, ideologies appear to explain and justify the current distribution of wealth and power in a society.  In societies with unequal allocations of wealth and power, ideologies present these inequalities as acceptable, virtuous, inevitable, and so forth.  Ideologies thus tend to lead people to accept the status quo.  The subordinate people come to believe in their subordination: the peasants to accept the rule of the aristocracy, the factory workers to accept the rule of the owners, consumers the rule of corporations. This belief in one's own subordination, which comes about through ideology, is, for Marx, false consciousness.

That is, conditions of inequality create ideologies which confuse people about their true aspirations, loyalties, and purposes.  Thus, for example, the working class has often been, for Marx, beguiled by nationalism, organized religion, and other distractions.  These ideological devices help to keep people from realizing that it is they who produce wealth, they who deserve the fruits of the land, all who can prosper: instead of literally thinking for themselves, they think the thoughts given to them by the ruling class.

Consciousness and the political-economy

For Marx, consciousness is a reflection of the political economy.  A person's thoughts tend to be shaped by his or her political and economic circumstances.  He famously wrote, "It is not the consciousness of men that determines their being, but, on the contrary, their social being that determines their consciousness."

Perhaps Marx's greatest contribution to modern thought... is his comprehensive investigation into the role of Ideology, or how social being determines consciousness, which results in certain (for the most part unconscious) belief and value systems depending on the particular economic infrastructure pertaining at the time. From a Marxian point of view all cultural artifacts--religious systems, philosophical positions, ethical values--are, naturally enough, products of consciousness and as such are subject to these ideological pressures.

Consciousness and social movements

Many social movements have loosely followed Marx's thinking on consciousness.  Attaining consciousness, many believe, means finding one's true historical path, as opposed to the propaganda dispensed by the ruling elites.  Thus, the feminist movement spoke of consciousness raising and many South African activists have subscribe to a Black Consciousness Movement, which calls upon Blacks to pursue their "true" political trajectory (as opposed to the ideas set out by, for example, the apartheid regime).  In the latter example, for many South African Blacks, consciousness meant rejecting racist ideas about Blacks, rejecting White rule of the nation, and restoring Black identity, history, and power.

In a politically charged sense, becoming "politically conscious" is often meant to connote that people have awakened to their true political role, their actual identity.  For Marx, this meant that the working classes would become conscious of themselves as the agents of history--they would unite and share in the wealth of labor.  This, for Marx, was their historical role and their right (as opposed to working for wages, fighting wars on behalf of capitalists, and so forth).  For many African Americans, "consciousness" has meant identifying and discrediting forms of White supremacy, including those internalized by Blacks.  In these uses of the term "consciousness" is truth or destiny.  These uses of political consciousness are often politically charged.  Does, for example, a Black woman lack consciousness because she generally supports a system run mostly by White male capitalists?  If she became politically conscious would she think differently?  What is her "true" consciousness supposed to look like?

Many Marxists, feminists, African Americans (and other groups), have ceased to argue that there is one true form of consciousness.  Instead, while preserving a sense that the ruling class perpetuates a dominant ideology and often behaves in ways which harm people, many dissenters now hold a more liberal position which tolerates a variety of political positions.  The complexities of political consciousness are described by the theories of cultural hegemony.

See also
 Critical consciousness
 Class consciousness
 Consciousness raising
 Double consciousness
 History of Consciousness, an interdisciplinary program at the University of California, Santa Cruz.
 Identity politics
 Woke

Notes

References
 Frederic Jameson, The Political Unconscious.

External links
 Outline for Hegel's ideas on consciousness at Marxists.org

Marxist theory
Political philosophy
Concepts in political philosophy
Identity politics
Critical pedagogy